This is a list of countries by guaranteed minimum income. Guaranteed minimum income is the amount of money a person is entitled to from the social welfare system in the absence of any other source of income.

Methodology 
The data are sourced from the OECD, and are expressed as a percentage of the national median disposable income.

List

References 

Income